Munje! (Serbian Cyrillic: Муње; English: Dudes or Thunderbirds) is a 2001 film directed by Radivoje Andrić. The main cast include Boris Milivojević, Sergej Trifunović, Nikola Đuričko, Maja Mandžuka, Milica Vujović, Zoran Cvijanović and Nebojša Glogovac. Famous football player of Belgrade's Crvena Zvezda Dušan Savić also appears as a special guest, portraying himself.

Plot 
Urban comedy, happening during a night in Belgrade. Mare (Boris Milivojević), Pop (Sergej Trifunović) and Gojko (Nikola Đuričko) are three friends who grew up together. Mare and Pop have always been musicians, while Gojko (who was harassed by them in school and nicknamed 'Sissy') became a "guy in suit", boss of his own club and recording studio.

Pop and Mare call on their friend from school days to help them release the record, but all this doesn't go so smoothly. Gojko hasn't forgotten his school days and now he is surrounded by bodyguards. On their way to the club, Mare and Pop meet false Santa Claus, "cool" cop and of course - girls.

Cast 
 Boris Milivojević as Mare
 Sergej Trifunović as Pop
 Nikola Đuričko as Gojko
 Maja Mandžuka as Kata
 Milica Vujović as Lola
 Zoran Cvijanović as false Santa Claus
 Nebojša Glogovac as the Police Officer

Soundtrack 
The soundtrack include the songs composed for the movie, but also the songs of the other authors.

 "Munje!" by Mao
 "Rizlu imas licnu kartu nemas" by Meso
 "Fool Control" by Eyesburn
 "Superstar" by Darko Džambasov & Frtalj bukvara
 "Beg sa žura" by Darko Obradović and Branislav Kovačević
 "Gojko je moj dečko" by Darko Obradović and Branislav Kovačević
 "Congrats" by Dominator
 "Muzika za ljubljenje" by Darko Obradović and Branislav Kovačević
 "Izlazim" by Kanda, Kodža i Nebojša
 "Nigde" by Urgh!
 "Hoću da džonjam" by Kolibriks
 "A ko matori" by Sova
 "Devojka iz drugog sveta" by Neočekivana Sila Koja Se Iznenada Pojavljuje i Rešava Stvar
 "Noon Chaka Superfly" by Noon Chaka Superfly
 "Piano Roll" by Noon Chaka Superfly
 "Zapremina tela" by Darkwood Dub
 "Novo svetsko čudo" by MC Flex (song of Beogradski sindikat)
 "Right Direction" by Kanda, Kodža i Nebojša
 "4 Hero Live in Belgrade" by 4 Hero
 "Prvi pogled tvoj" by E-Play
 "Manitua mi II" by Kanda, Kodža i Nebojša
 "Apokalipso" by Darko Rundek
 "Chica" by Sport i Reinkarnacija
 "Disaster" by Neočekivana Sila Koja Se Iznenada Pojavljuje i Rešava Stvar
 "Zašto ja" by Dr Iggy
 "Battle Hymn of the Republic" by Fife & Drum Band
 "Druga" by E-Play
 "Crossover" by 4 Tune

References

External links 
 Official Website
 

2001 films
Serbian comedy films
Films set in Serbia
Films set in Belgrade
Films shot in Belgrade